The T26C was a single-seater racing car designed and developed by French manufacturer Talbot-Lago. It featured a box section chassis, an unsupercharged 4.5 litre straight six engine and a four speed Wilson preselector gearbox. The chassis and gearbox were derived from the company's 1930s racing cars and were similar to those used on their post-war road cars. For the 1950 Formula One season a version with a more powerful engine was introduced, with revised carburation and twin spark plugs. These variants are known as T26C-DA (for Double Allume, i.e. twin plug).

Racing history
The T26C made its racing debut in the 1948 Monaco Grand Prix, finishing second in the hands of Louis Chiron. Grand Prix victories were achieved the following year with Louis Rosier winning the 1949 Belgian Grand Prix and Louis Chiron winning the 1949 French Grand Prix.

A modified version, the T26C-GS (for Grand Sport), fitted with two-seater bodywork, cycle wings and lights, won the 1950 24 Hours of Le Mans driven by Louis Rosier and Jean-Louis Rosier.

Doug Whiteford won the 1952 and 1953 Australian Grand Prix driving a Talbot-Lago T26C.

Complete Formula One World Championship results

Works team entries
(key)

* Indicates shared drive with Charles Pozzi in his privately entered T26C

n.b. Prior to  there was no Constructor's World Championship, hence constructors were not awarded points.

Results of other Talbot-Lago cars
(key) (Results in bold indicate pole position; results in italics indicate fastest lap.) * Indicates shared drive

References 

Talbot-Lago T26C
Cars introduced in 1948
1950s cars
Formula One cars